Birbhadra Shah (died c. 1697) was the Crown prince of the Gorkha state in Nepal. He was the son of Prithvipati Shah and the father of Nara Bhupal Shah. Birbhadra Shah died while returning from Bhaktapur to Gorkha.

References

Gurkhas
1690s deaths
Year of death uncertain
Year of birth unknown
17th-century Nepalese people
Nepalese Hindus
Heirs apparent who never acceded